Larry Neil Cohen (born April 14, 1959) is an American bridge player, writer and teacher. He has won 25 North American Bridge Championships (NABC) events including the Vanderbilt, two Spingolds, two Reisingers, three Life Master Pairs, and four Blue Ribbon Pairs, and he is a two-time winner of the Cavendish Invitational Pairs cash prize tournament.

Cohen's most important work on "the Law" was To Bid or Not to Bid: The LAW of Total Tricks, published in 1992. It was the best-selling bridge book of the 1990s with more than 90,000 copies sold in six different languages and its sequel Following the Law was another bridge best seller. He is known for long-term expert partnerships with Marty Bergen, Ron Gerard, and David Berkowitz, but announced his retirement from high-level competition in 2009 to devote more time to writing and teaching the game. However, he has, on occasion, played in high-level competition thereafter.

Cohen was born in New York City. He learned to play bridge at age six with his grandparents and brother Paul Cohen, started playing duplicate at age 14, and began playing in tournaments at age 15. He became an American Contract Bridge League (ACBL) Life Master at age 17.

He now makes a living as a bridge teacher, often on cruise ships and as a guest speaker/teacher at country clubs and bridge clubs across the United States and around the world. In March 2020 he and his team successfully transitioned into live webinars. He writes monthly columns titled The Real Deal and Bidding Basics, in the ACBL Bridge Bulletin.  An extensive list of bridge articles and information can be found on his website and in his regular newsletters.  He currently resides with his wife, Maria Eugenia, in Delray Beach, Florida.

Bridge accomplishments

Honors
 ACBL Hall of Fame, 2020
 Sidney H. Lazard Jr. Sportsmanship Award 2003

Awards
 ACBL Named in Top 52 Most Influential People of Bridge 2013
 ACBL Honorary Member of the Year 2011
 ACBL Sportsman of the Year 2003
 ITES Award (Best Defended Hand of the Year) 2003 (Winning Journalist)
 ACBL Player of the Year 2002
 Romex Award (Best Bid Hand of the Year) 1995, 2000
 Precision Award (Best Defended Hand of the Year) 1996
 ABTA Winner of seven+ Book/Software of the Year Awards

Wins
 North American Bridge Championships (25)
 Grand National Teams (3) 1994, 2007, 2008 
 Blue Ribbon Pairs (4) 1981, 1983, 1988, 1995 
 Keohane North American Swiss Teams (1) 1999 
 Mitchell Board-a-Match Teams (3) 1984, 1991, 2007 
 Chicago Mixed Board-a-Match (1) 2002 
 Nail Life Master Open Pairs (1) 1983 
 Reisinger (2) 1985, 1991 
 Silodor Open Pairs (3) 2004, 2006, 2009 
 Spingold (2) 1981, 1984 
 Vanderbilt (1) 2005 
 Wernher Open Pairs (1) 1996 
 von Zedtwitz Life Master Pairs (3) 1987, 1988, 1996 
 United States Bridge Championships (1)
 Open Team Trials (1) 2000
 Other notable wins:
 Buffett Cup (1) 2006
 Cavendish Invitational Teams (2) 1988, 1994
 Pan American Open Teams (1) 1992
 Cap Gemini World Top Invitational Pairs (1) 1999
 Cavendish Invitational Pairs (2) 1984, 1989
 Goldman Pairs (1) 1983

Runners-up
 World Open Pairs (1) 1998
 North American Bridge Championships (22)
 North American Pairs (2) 1980, 1984 
 Grand National Teams (1) 1991 
 Blue Ribbon Pairs (1) 1996 
 Keohane North American Swiss Teams (1) 2006 
 Mitchell Board-a-Match Teams (2) 1990, 2008 
 Chicago Mixed Board-a-Match (1) 1994 
 Nail Life Master Open Pairs (3) 1986, 1991, 2002 
 Reisinger (3) 2002, 2004, 2007 
 Silodor Open Pairs (2) 1979, 2002 
 Spingold (2) 1983, 2009 
 Vanderbilt (4) 1990, 1993, 1998, 2004 
 United States Bridge Championships (4)
 Open Team Trials (4) 1985, 1998, 2002, 2008
 Other notable 2nd places:
 Cavendish Invitational Teams (2) 1986, 2000
 Goldman Pairs (1) 1991

Selected works
Books
 Larry Teaches Modern Bidding Vol. I, II, and III (Self-Published 2020) ABTA Award Winner
 On The Other Hand Co-written with David Bird (2019) ABTA Award Winner
 On The Other Hand - Defense Co-written with David Bird (2020) ABTA Award Winner
 Tricks of the Trade (2018) ABTA Award Winner
 Larry Teaches Declarer Play at Suit Contracts (Self-Published March 2017)
 Larry Teaches Declarer Play at Notrump (Self-Published April 2016)
 Larry Teaches Defense (Self-Published March 2015)
 Larry Teaches Opening Leads (Self-Published October 2014) ABTA Award Winner
 Larry Teaches Doubles and Redoubles (Self-Published October 2013)
 Larry Teaches 2/1 Game Force (Self-Published April 2012)
 My Favorite 52 (Toronto: Master Point Press, 2009)
 Larry Cohen's Bidding Challenge (Toronto: Master Point Press, 2002) 
 Introduction to the Law (Devyn Press, 1997)
 Bridge Below the Belt, Cohen and Liz Davis (Boca Raton, FL: Natco, 1997)  
 Following the LAW: The Total Tricks Sequel (Little Falls, NJ: Natco Press, 1995; (c) 1994) 
 To Bid or Not to Bid: The LAW of Total Tricks (Stamford, CT: Platinum Press, 1992)  ABTA Award Winner

Interactive CD ROMsThe Real Deal Advanced (2010) ABTA Award WinnerThe Real Deal Intermediate (2010) ABTA Award WinnerPlay Bridge with Larry Cohen (1999 Life Master Pairs) Day 1, Day 2, and Day 3 ABTA Award WinnerMy Favorite 52 (2005) ABTA Award Winner

CDsTalking Bridge (2012) ABTA Award Winner

DVDsIncluding: Larry Teaches Third-Hand Play, Second-Hand Play, Signals, Opening Leads, Defensive Planning, Declarer Play at Notrump, Declarer Play at Suit Contracts Draw or Not Draw Trump, 2/1 Game Force, Takeout Doubles, and Slam Bidding.'' (2019) ABTA Award Winner -Technology of the Year

References

External links
 
 
 Audio-video presentation by Cohen of partner David Berkowitz for ACBL Hall of Fame induction (uploaded July 24, 2010, by Cohen)
  – among several under 'Cohen, Larry' without '1959-', on the previous page of the browse report

1959 births
American contract bridge players
Contract bridge writers
Writers from New York City
Living people